Vance may refer to:

Locations

United States
Vance, Alabama, a town
Vance Township, Vermilion County, Illinois
Vance, Mississippi, an unincorporated community
Vance, Nebraska, an unincorporated community
Vance County, North Carolina
Vance, South Carolina, a town
Vance, Virginia, an unincorporated community
Vance, West Virginia, an unincorporated community
Vance Air Force Base, Enid, Oklahoma, named after Leon Vance

Other
Vancé, a commune of the Sarthe département in France
Vance, Belgium, a village of Étalle commune in Belgium
Mount Vance, Marie Byrd Land, Antarctica
Vance Bluff, Oates Land, Antarctica
Vance Seamounts, seven seamounts (submarine volcanoes) in the Pacific Ocean
Vance Industrial Estate, an industrial subdivision in Leeton, New South Wales, Australia

People and fictional characters 
Vance (surname)
Vance (given name)

Other uses 
Cyclone Vance, a 1999 severe tropical cyclone
Hurricane Vance, in the 1990 Pacific hurricane season
, named for Joseph Williams Vance Jr.
Vance International Airways, a defunct American airline
Vance High School, Charlotte, North Carolina
Vance Cemetery, Weaverville, North Carolina